Alisarda S.p.A. operating as Alisarda was an Italian airline based in Olbia, Sardinia that operated between 1963 and 1991 before it merged with Universair to become Meridiana. As of 2019, Alisarda S.p.A. is a holding company with a 51% stake in Meridiana successor airline Air Italy.

History
The airline used Nord 262 aircraft between Olbia and Rome. These were replaced in 1969 by the Fokker F27 Friendship and with those aircraft, routes to Pisa, Bologna and Cagliari were commenced.
The next aircraft type to be introduced was the  Douglas DC-9-14 twin-jet airliner with which charter flights to Germany were started. By 1975 the fleet was wholly composed of DC-9s. In the early 1980s it was an associate company of Consorzio Della Costa Smeralda in which Prince Karim Aga Khan had a majority shareholding.

In 1986, Alisarda took 50% ownership of the newly-created Avianova. In mid-1987, the carrier took delivery of a second MD-82 and a third aircraft of the type was ordered.

At March 1990, the number of employees was approximately 1,000 and the president was Sergio Peralda. At this time, the airline was owned by a number of financial groups in which Prince Karim Aga Khan had a major interest. The fleet consisted of six McDonnell Douglas DC-9-51s and five MD-82s. Scheduled services were flown to Bologna, Cagliari, Genoa, Milan, Naples, Olbia, Pisa, Rome and Verona, and Frankfurt, Geneva, Munich, Nice, Paris, Turin and Zurich were served on a seasonal basis.

In 1991, Alisarda and the Spanish airline Universair merged, to form Meridiana. As of 2019, Alisarda is a holding company with a 51% stake in the Meridiana successor airline Air Italy.

Fleet
Over the years, Alisarda operated the following aircraft:

Gallery

References

 

Italian companies established in 1963
Italian companies disestablished in 1991
Defunct airlines of Italy
Transport in Sardinia
Airlines established in 1963
Airlines disestablished in 1991

it:Meridiana (azienda)